Sammy the Owl is the official mascot for the Rice Owls of Rice University.

History
An early symbol of Rice's athletic teams was large canvas owl, a tempting target for Rice Institute's rivals. In 1917, when students from Southwest Conference football rival Texas A&M kidnapped the owl, Rice students pooled their resources and hired a private detective to go to College Station to find the missing mascot. Upon recovering the owl, the detective sent a coded telegram to Houston that read "Sammy is fairly well and would like to see his parents at eleven o'clock," giving the mascot a name for the first time.

Eventually, the canvas representation of Sammy was replaced with a live owl.  During this period, handlers kept Sammy in a roost in front of Lovett College.  Prior to football games, Sammy was known to fly into the stadium.

Rice University later discontinued its tradition of a live owl, replacing it with a student dressed in an owl suit.  As such, Sammy the Owl is an elected position of the Rice University Student Body.

Notable events
 1917 - Canvas depiction of Rice Owl stolen by students from Texas A&M.  Mascot is recovered and given name Sammy.
 1986 - Sammy the Owl (Truscott) performs world-famous "Shadow the SMU Drum Major" routine at halftime so successfully that letters were written to Rice President George Rupp from SMU officials.
 1991 - Sammy the Owl suit reinvented and redesigned to meet the needs of the 6'+ Keith Jaasma and Greg Meeks.  Sammy appears increasingly frumpy in subsequent years as normal-size human beings inhabit the suit.
 1991 - Sammy's head is stolen during a road trip to UT.
 1992 - Keith Jaasma removed from Sammy the Owl duties because he is deemed so attractive that female game attendees stop watching the game and only watch Sammy do his patented Owl Shimmy.  Official University records reflect that Mr. Jaasma "graduated" from Rice that year.
 1993 - While dressed as Sammy the Owl, Bill Breslin faints at half time during a televised Rice vs University of Texas at Austin football game (at Memorial Stadium),  much to the concern of the referees.
 1995 - Student Sammy the Owl is tried before UCourt (Rice student judicial organization) on charges stemming from November 9, 1995, football game against No. 9 Texas A&M.
 1995 - Sammy the Owl elected homecoming queen.
 1996 - Sammy receives a make-over and a new suit is unveiled.
 2004 - Sammy the Owl is featured in Playboy Magazine's story on College Mascots
 2006 - Sammy's Owl suit is upgraded.
 2007 - Sammy joined Facebook and Twitter
 2009 - Sammy is ejected from a basketball game against Tulane for bumping an official.

Other appearances
Sammy the Owl has also served as the image of Rice athletics for many years.  Past images have depicted Sammy as wearing a sailor hat.  In 1995, the image of the owl swooping in behind the university's name replaced old images of Sammy.

The Rice Thresher awards its annual "Sammies" to the best performances in Rice theater.  These awards are given by the Thresher staff without consultation with the mascot but use his name nonetheless.  Remarkably, Greg Meeks, Sammy the Owl, 1991-1992 also won a Sammie best actor award for his performance as Richard the Lionheart in 1992.

Sammy the Owl is also the mascot of a fictional high school in the movie Rushmore, filmed in Houston.

Debates Surrounding Sammy
Sammy the Owl is elected annually during the Rice University Student Association's spring election.  This practice, however, has been debated since the mid-1990s.  In 1995, following an incident during the Rice-Texas A&M football game, the question of who should be responsible for Sammy the Owl was raised.  Following much debate, it was decided that Sammy would remain an elected student, but would be formally accountable to the athletics department.

References

Rice University
Rice Owls
Conference USA mascots
Owl mascots
1917 establishments in Texas